The Kansas City Royals entered the 2016 season as the defending World Series champions, hoping to reach the World Series for the third consecutive season. Before the season, the team signed free agents Ian Kennedy (a starting pitcher) and Joakim Soria (a reliever) and re-signed star Alex Gordon. However, several players from the previous year's team departed in free agency, including right fielder Alex Rios, second baseman/outfielder Ben Zobrist, and pitchers Greg Holland, Ryan Madson, and Franklin Morales.

The 2016 Royals team was adversely affected by injuries to Gordon, center fielder Lorenzo Cain, closer Wade Davis, and third baseman Mike Moustakas. The team was eliminated from postseason contention with four games left in the season, becoming the fourth consecutive World Series winner to miss the playoffs the following year. The Royals ended the season with an 81–81 record, finishing in third place in the Central Division.

Season standings

American League Central

American League Division Leaders

Record against opponents

Game log

|-bgcolor="bbffbb"
| 1 || April 3 || Mets || 4–3 || Vólquez (1–0) || Harvey (0–1)  || Davis (1) || 40,030 || 1–0 ||W1
|- bgcolor="ffbbbb"
| 2 || April 5 || Mets || 0–2 || Syndergaard (1–0)  || Young (0–1)  || Familia (1)  || 39,782 || 1–1 || L1
|- bgcolor="bbffbb"
| 3 || April 8 || Twins || 4–3 || Soria (1–0)  || Jepsen (0–2)  || Davis (2)  || 27,166 || 2–1 || W1
|- bgcolor="bbffbb"
| 4 || April 9 || Twins || 7–0 || Kennedy (1–0)  || Milone (0–1) || — || 31,001 || 3–1 || W2
|- bgcolor="bbffbb"
| 5 || April 10 || Twins || 4–3 || Davis (1–0)  || May (0–1) || — || 35,317 || 4–1 || W3
|- bgcolor="ffbbbb"
| 6 || April 11 || @ Astros || 2–8 || McHugh (1–1)  || Young (0–2)  || — || 43,332 || 4–2 || L1
|- bgcolor="bbffbb"
| 7 || April 12 || @ Astros || 3–2 || Medlen (1–0)  || Fiers (0–1)  || Davis (3)  || 21,027 || 5–2 || W1
|- bgcolor="bbffbb"
| 8 || April 13 || @ Astros || 4–2 || Hochevar (1–0)  || Giles (0–1)  || Soria (1)  || 24,109 || 6–2 || W2
|- bgcolor="bbffbb"
| 9 || April 14 || @ Astros || 6–2 || Kennedy (2–0)  || Fister (1–1)  || Davis (4)  || 21,203 || 7–2 || W3
|- bgcolor="bbffbb"
| 10 || April 15 || @ Athletics || 4–2 || Vólquez (1–0)  || Hill (1–2) || Davis (5)  || 19,451 || 8–2 || W4
|- bgcolor="ffbbbb"
| 11 || April 16 || @ Athletics || 3–5 || Gray (2–1) || Young (0–3)  || Madson (3)  || 25,564 || 8–3 || L1
|- bgcolor="ffbbbb"
| 12 || April 17 || @ Athletics || 2–3 || Axford (2–0) || Soria (1–1)  || Madson (4)  || 29,668 || 8–4 || L2
|- bgcolor="bbffbb"
| 13 || April 19 || Tigers || 8–6 || Ventura (1–0)  || Greene (1–1)  || Davis (6)  || 26,889 || 9–4 || W1
|- bgcolor="ffbbbb"
| 14 || April 20 || Tigers || 2–3 || Zimmermann (3–0)  || Kennedy (2–1)  || Rodríguez (4)  || 28,928 || 9–5 || L1
|- bgcolor="bbffbb"
| 15 || April 21 || Tigers || 4–0 || Vólquez (3–0) || Pelfrey (0–3)  || — || 30,763 || 10–5 || W1
|- bgcolor="bbffbb"
| 16 || April 22 || Orioles || 4–2 || Young (1–3) || Gallardo (1–1) || Davis (7) || 29,546 || 11–5 || W2
|- bgcolor="ffbbbb"
| 17 || April 23 || Orioles || 3–8 || Wilson (1–0) || Medlen (1–1) || — || 39,900 || 11–6 || L1
|- bgcolor="bbffbb"
| 18 || April 24 || Orioles || 6–1 || Ventura (2–0) || Wright (1–2) || — || 34,748 || 12–6 || W1
|- bgcolor="ffbbbb"
| 19 || April 25 || @ Angels || 1–6 || Richards (1–3)|| Kennedy (2–2) || — || 31,061 || 12–7  || L1
|- bgcolor="ffbbbb"
| 20 || April 26 || @ Angels || 4–9 || Weaver (3–0) || Vólquez (3–1) || — || 34,428 || 12–8 || L2
|- bgcolor="ffbbbb"
| 21 || April 27 || @ Angels || 2–4 || Salas (1–1) || Young (1–4) || Smith (1) || 35,142 || 12–9 || L3
|- bgcolor="ffbbbb"
| 22 || April 29 || @ Mariners || 0–1 || Hernández (2–2) || Medlen (1–2) || Cishek (6) || 38,684 || 12–10 || L4
|- bgcolor="ffbbbb"
| 23 || April 30 || @ Mariners || 0–6 || Miley (2–2)|| Ventura (2–1) || — || 43,444 || 12–11 || L5
|-

|- bgcolor="bbffbb"
| 24 || May 1 || @ Mariners || 4–1 || Kennedy (3–2) || Walker (2–1) || Davis (8) || 37,053 || 13–11 || W1
|- bgcolor="ffbbbb"
| 25 || May 2 || Nationals || 0–2 || Gonzalez (2–1) || Vólquez (3–2) || Papelbon (9) || 32,394 || 13–12 || L1
|- bgcolor="bbffbb"
| 26 || May 3 || Nationals || 7–6 || Wang (1–0) || Papelbon (0–2) || — || 33,729 || 14–12 || W1
|- bgcolor="ffbbbb"
| 27 || May 4 || Nationals || 2–13 || Strasburg (5–0) || Medlen (1–3) || — || 38,610 || 14–13 || L1
|- bgcolor="ffbbbb"
| 28 || May 6 || @ Indians || 1–7 || Salazar (3–2) || Ventura (2–2) || — || 13,587 || 14–14 || L2
|- bgcolor="bbffbb"
| 29 || May 7 || @ Indians || 7–0 || Kennedy (4–2) || Anderson (0–2) || — || 17,302 || 15–14 || W1
|- bgcolor="ffbbbb"
| 30 || May 8 || @ Indians || 4–5 || Tomlin (5–0) || Vólquez (3–3) || Allen (8) || 14,463 || 15–15 || L1
|- bgcolor="ffbbbb"
| 31 || May 9 || @ Yankees || 3–6 || Yates (2–0) || Young (1–5) || — || 41,243 || 15–16 || L2
|- bgcolor="ffbbbb"
| 32 || May 10 || @ Yankees || 7–10 || Miller (2–0) || Herrera (0–1) || Chapman (1) || 39,128 || 15–17 || L3
|- bgcolor="bbffbb"
| 33 || May 11 || @ Yankees || 7–3 || Ventura (3–2) || Pineda (1–4) || — || 31,226 || 16–17 || W1
|- bgcolor="ffbbbb"
| 34 || May 12 || @ Yankees || 3–7 || Eovaldi (3–2) || Kennedy (4–3) || — || 35,944 || 16–18 || L1
|- bgcolor="bbffbb"
| 35 || May 13 || Braves || 5–1 || Vólquez (4–3) || Teherán (0–4) || — || 33,132 || 17–18 || W1
|- bgcolor="ffbbbb"
| 36 || May 14 || Braves || 0–5 || Foltynewicz (1–1) || Gee (0–1) || — || 36,541 || 17–19 || L1
|- bgcolor="bbffbb"
| 37 || May 15 || Braves || 4–2 (13) || Wang (2–0) || O'Flaherty (0–3) || — || 33,861 || 18–19 || W1
|- style="text-align:center; style="background-color:#bbb;"
| –  || May 16 || Red Sox ||colspan="8" | Postponed (rain). Makeup date: May 18th.
|- bgcolor="bbffbb"
| 38 || May 17 || Red Sox || 8–4 || Ventura (4–2) || Porcello (6–2) || — || 25,215 || 19–19 || W2
|- bgcolor="bbffbb"
| 39 || May 18 || Red Sox || 3–2 || Flynn (1–0) || Wright (3–4) || Davis (9) || 33,613 || 20–19 || W3
|- bgcolor="ffbbbb"
| 40 || May 18 || Red Sox || 2–5 || Price (6–1) || Vólquez (4–4) || Kimbrel (11) || 23,739 || 20–20 || L1
|- bgcolor="bbffbb"
| 41 || May 20 || @ White Sox || 4–1 || Gee (1–1) || Quintana (5–3) || Davis (10) || 24,020 || 21–20 || W1
|- bgcolor="bbffbb"
| 42 || May 21 || @ White Sox || 2–1 || Soria (2–1) || González (0–1) || Davis (11) || 27,631 || 22–20 || W2
|- bgcolor="ffbbbb"
| 43 || May 22 || @ White Sox || 2–3 || Rodon (2–4) || Ventura (4–3) || Robertson (11) || 34,526 || 22–21 || L1
|- bgcolor="bbffbb"
| 44 || May 23 || @ Twins || 10–4 || Moylan (1–0) || Nolasco (1–3) || — || 17,886 || 23–21 || W1
|- bgcolor="bbffbb"
| 45 || May 24 || @ Twins || 7–4 || Vólquez (5–4) || Santana (1–3) || Davis (12) || 23,541 || 24–21 || W2
|- bgcolor="ffbbbb"
| 46 || May 25 || @ Twins || 5–7 || Duffey (2–3) || Gee (1–2) || Jepsen (4) || 27,233 || 24–22 || L1
|- style="text-align:center; style="background-color:#bbb;"
| – || May 26 || White Sox || colspan="8" | Postponed (rain). Makeup date: TBA.
|- bgcolor="bbffbb"
| 47 || May 27 || White Sox || 7–5 || Moylan (2–0) || Albers (1–4) || Davis (13) || 28,508 || 25–22 || W1
|- bgcolor="bbffbb"
| 48 || May 28 || White Sox || 8–7 || Wang (2–0) || Kahnle (0–1) || — || 31,598 || 26–22 || W2
|- bgcolor="bbffbb"
| 49 || May 29 || White Sox || 5–4 || Young (2–5) || Jones (2–1) || Davis (14) || 36,624 || 27–22 || W3
|- bgcolor="bbffbb"
| 50 || May 30 || Rays || 6–2 || Herrera (1–1) || Ramírez (6–3) || — || 32,018 || 28–22 || W4
|- bgcolor="bbffbb"
| 51 || May 31 || Rays || 10–5 || Gee (2–2) || Smyly (2–7) || Davis (15) || 26,006 || 29–22 || W5
|-

|- bgcolor="bbffbb"
| 52 || June 1 || Rays || 6–3 || Duffy (1–0) || Archer (3–7) || Davis (16) || 30,554 || 30–22 || W6
|- bgcolor="ffbbbb"
| 53 || June 2 || @ Indians || 4–5 || Hunter (2–1) || Soria (2–2) || — || 11,131 || 30–23 || L1
|- bgcolor="ffbbbb"
| 54 || June 3 || @ Indians || 1–6 || Salazar (6–3) || Vólquez (5–5) || — || 24,753 || 30–24 || L2
|- bgcolor="ffbbbb"
| 55 || June 4 || @ Indians || 1–7 || Tomlin (8–1) || Kennedy (4–4) || — || 23,258 || 30–25 || L3
|- bgcolor="ffbbbb"
| 56 || June 5 || @ Indians || 0–7 || Kluber (5–6) || Young (2–6) || — || 16,747 || 30–26 || L4
|- bgcolor="ffbbbb"
| 57 || June 6 || @ Orioles || 1–4 || Wright (3–3) || Duffy (1–1) || Britton (18) || 14,878 || 30–27 || L5
|- bgcolor="ffbbbb"
| 58 || June 7 || @ Orioles || 1–9 || Jiménez (3–6)|| Ventura (4–4) ||  || 28,110 || 30–28 || L6
|- bgcolor="ffbbbb"
| 59 || June 8 || @ Orioles || 0–4 || Tillman (8–1) || Vólquez (5–6) || Brach (2) || 19,178 || 30–29 || L7
|- bgcolor="ffbbbb"
| 60 || June 10 || @ White Sox || 7–5 || Sale (10–2)|| Kennedy (4–5) || Robertson (15) || 31,183 || 30-30 || L8
|- bgcolor="bbffbb"
| 61 || June 11 || @ White Sox || 4–1 || Duffy (2–1) || Quintana (5–7) || — || 31,183 || 31-30 || W1
|- bgcolor="bbffbb"
| 62 || June 12 || @ White Sox || 1–3 || Ventura (5–4) || Rodon (2–6) || Davis (17) || 30,363 || 32-30 || W2
|- bgcolor="bbffbb"
| 63 || June 13 || Indians || 2–1 || Vólquez (6–6) || Carrasco (2–2) || — || 31,269 || 33–30 ||W3
|- bgcolor="bbffbb"
| 64 || June 14 || Indians || 3–2 || Soria (3–2) || Shaw (0–3) || — || 29,293 || 34–30 ||W4
|- bgcolor="bbffbb"
| 65 || June 15 || Indians || 9–4 ||  Kennedy (5–5) ||  Kluber (6–7) || — || 33,546 || 35–30 ||W5
|- bgcolor="ffbbbb"
| 66 || June 16 || Tigers || 4–10 ||  Verlander (7–5) ||  Hochevar (1–1) || — || 33,568 || 35–31 ||L1
|- bgcolor="bbffbb"
| 67 || June 17 || Tigers || 10–3 ||  Ventura (6–4) || Fulmer (7–2) || — || 37,746 || 36–31 ||W1
|- bgcolor="bbffbb"
| 68 || June 18 || Tigers || 16–5 || Vólquez (7–6) || Boyd (0–2) || — || 38,480 || 37–31 ||W2
|- bgcolor="bbffbb"
| 69 || June 19 || Tigers || 2–1 (13)|| Wang (4–0) || Ryan (1–2) || — || 34,659 || 38–31 ||W3
|- bgcolor="ffbbbb"
| 70 || June 21 || @ Mets || 0–2 || Robles (1–3) || Kennedy (5–6) || Familia (23) || 40,122 || 38–32 ||L1
|- bgcolor="ffbbbb"
| 71 || June 22 || @ Mets ||3–4|| Syndergaard (8–2) || Soria (3–3) || Familia (24) || 35,185 || 38–33 ||L2
|- bgcolor="ffbbbb"
| 72 || June 24 || Astros || 4–13 ||Keuchel (4–9)  || Vólquez (7–7) || — || 36,195 || 38–34 ||L3
|- bgcolor="ffbbbb"
| 73 || June 25 || Astros || 5–13 ||Feliz (5–1)  || Young (2–7) ||—  || 38,880 || 38–35 ||L4
|- bgcolor="bbffbb"
| 74 || June 26 || Astros || 6–1 ||Kennedy (6–6)  || Fister (8–4) || — || 36,450 || 39–35 ||W1
|- bgcolor="bbffbb"
| 75 || June 27 || Cardinals || 6–2 ||Duffy (3–1)  || Wainwright (6–5) || — || 31,355 || 40–35 ||W2
|- bgcolor="ffbbbb"
| 76 || June 28 || Cardinals || 4–8 || Wacha (4–7)|| Ventura (6–5) || — || 32,909 || 40–36 ||L1
|- bgcolor="bbffbb"
| 77 || June 29 || @ Cardinals || 3–2 12 || Wang (5–0) || Maness (0–2) || — || 44,840 || 41–36 ||W1
|- bgcolor="bbffbb"
| 78 || June 30 || @ Cardinals || 4–2 || Gee (3–2) || Leake (5–6) || Davis (19) || 44,802 || 42–36 ||W2
|-

|- bgcolor="ffbbbb"
| 79 || July 1 || @ Phillies || 3–4 || Hellickson (6–6) || Kennedy (6–7) || Gómez (22) || 30,263 || 42–37 ||L1
|- bgcolor="bbffbb"
| 80 || July 2 || @ Phillies || 6–2 || Duffy (4–1) || Nola (5–8) || — || 40,331 || 43–37 ||W1
|- bgcolor="ffbbbb"
| 81 || July 3 || @ Phillies || 2–7 || Velasquez (7–2) || Ventura (6–6) || — || 20,473 || 43–38 ||L1
|- bgcolor="ffbbbb"
| 82 || July 4 || @ Blue Jays || 2–6 || Sanchez (9–1) || Vólquez (7–8) || — || 36,438 || 43–39 ||L2
|- bgcolor="ffbbbb"
| 83 || July 5 || @ Blue Jays || 3–8 || Dickey (6–9) || Young (2–8) || — || 35,917 || 43–40 ||L3
|- bgcolor="ffbbbb"
| 84 || July 6 || @ Blue Jays || 2–4 || Stroman (7–4)||Herrera (1–2)||Osuna (17)||39,971||43–41||L4
|- bgcolor="bbffbb"
| 85 || July 7 || Mariners || 4–3 ||Pounders (1–0)||Cishek (2–5)||—||31,425||44–41||W1
|- bgcolor="ffbbbb"
| 86 || July 8 || Mariners || 2–3 ||Iwakuma (9–6)||Ventura (6–7)||Cishek (21)||33,391||44–42||L1
|- bgcolor="bbffbb"
| 87 || July 9 || Mariners || 5–3 ||Vólquez (8–8)||Miley (6–6)||Herrera (1)||30,659||45–42||W1
|- bgcolor="ffbbbb"
| 88 || July 10 || Mariners || 5–8 ||Montgomery (3–3)||Gee (3–3)||—||27,544||45–43||L1
|- style="text-align:center; background:#bbcaff;"
| colspan="10" | 87th All-Star Game in San Diego, California
|- bgcolor="ffbbbb"
| 89 || July 15 || @ Tigers || 2–4 || Verlander (9–6) || Hochevar (1–2) || Rodríguez (25) || 37,447 || 45–44 ||L2
|- bgcolor="bbffbb"
| 90 || July 16 || @ Tigers || 8–4 || Duffy (5–1) || Pelfrey (2–9) || — || 39,594 || 46–44 ||W1
|- bgcolor="ffbbbb"
| 91 || July 17 || @ Tigers || 2–4 ||Rodríguez (1–0)||Soria (3–4)|| — || 37,363 || 46–45 ||L1
|- bgcolor="bbffbb"
| 92 || July 18 || Indians || 7–3 || Hochevar (2–2) || Shaw (1–4) || Davis (20) || 38,042 || 47–45 ||W1
|- bgcolor="ffbbbb"
| 93 || July 19 || Indians || 3–7 || Salazar (11–3) || Flynn (1–1) || — || 31,144 || 47–46 ||L1
|- bgcolor="ffbbbb"
| 94 || July 20 || Indians || 4–11 || Carrasco (7–3) || Kennedy (6–8) || — || 33,455 || 47–47 ||L2
|- bgcolor="bbffbb"
| 95 || July 22 || Rangers || 3–1 || Duffy (6–1) || Darvish (2–2) || Davis (21) ||33,535|| 48–47 ||W1
|- bgcolor="ffbbbb"
| 96 || July 23 || Rangers || 4–7 || Hamels (11–2) || Ventura (6–8) || — ||32,132||48–48 ||L1
|- bgcolor="ffbbbb"
| 97 || July 24 || Rangers || 1–2 || Claudio (2–1) || Hochevar (2–3) || Dyson (20) ||32,739|| 48–49 ||L2
|- bgcolor="ffbbbb"
| 98 || July 25 || Angels || 2–6 || Santiago (9–4) || Kennedy (6–9) || — || 33,828 || 48–50 ||L3
|- bgcolor="ffbbbb"
| 99 || July 26 || Angels || 0–13 || Skaggs (1–0) || Gee (3–4) || — || 28,026 || 48–51 ||L4
|- bgcolor="bbffbb"
| 100 || July 27 || Angels || 5–7 || Soria (4–4) || Shoemaker (5–11) || — || 30,279 || 49–51 ||W1
|- bgcolor="ffbbbb"
| 101 || July 28 || @ Rangers || 2–3 || Hamels (12–2) || Ventura (6–9) || Dyson (21) ||36,008|| 49–52 ||L1
|- bgcolor="ffbbbb"
| 102 || July 29 || @ Rangers || 3–8 || Griffin (4–1) || Vólquez (8–9) || — || 40,008 || 49–53 ||L2
|- bgcolor="ffbbbb"
| 103 || July 30 || @ Rangers || 1–2 || Bush (4–2) || Pounders (1–1) || — || 47,125 || 49–54 ||L3
|- bgcolor="ffbbbb"
| 104 || July 31 || @ Rangers || 3–5 || Harrell (3–2) || Gee (3–5) || Dyson (22) ||32,806|| 49–55 ||L4
|-

|- bgcolor="bbffbb"
| 105 || August 1 || @ Rays || 3–0 || Duffy (7–1) || Archer (5–15) || Herrera (2) || 13,976 || 50–55 || W1
|- bgcolor="bbffbb"
| 106 || August 2 || @ Rays || 3–2 || Young (3–8) || Cedeño (3–3) || Herrera (3) || 12,625 || 51–55 || W2
|- bgcolor="ffbbbb"
| 107 || August 3 || @ Rays || 0–12 || Odorizzi (6–5) || Vólquez (8–10) || — || 11,149 || 51–56 ||L1
|- bgcolor="ffbbbb"
| 108 || August 4 || @ Rays || 2–3 || Boxberger (1–0) || Soria (4–5) || Colomé (26) || 13,120 || 51–57 ||L2
|- bgcolor="ffbbbb"
| 109 || August 5 || Blue Jays || 3–4 || Cecil (1–6) || Herrera (1–3) || Benoit (1) || 31,831 || 51–58 ||L3
|- bgcolor="bbffbb"
| 110 || August 6 || Blue Jays || 4–2 || Duffy (8–1) || Sanchez (11–2) || Herrera (4) || 35,986 || 52–58 ||W1
|- bgcolor="bbffbb"
| 111 || August 7 || Blue Jays || 7–1 || Ventura (7–9) || Stroman (8–5) || — || 25,830 || 53–58 ||W2
|- bgcolor="ffbbbb"
| 112 || August 9 || White Sox || 5–7 (10)|| Robertson (3–2) || Herrera (1–4) || Jennings (1) || 27,134 || 53–59 || L1
|- bgcolor="bbffbb"
| 113 || August 10 || White Sox || 3–2 (14) || Gee (4–5) || Albers (2–5) || — || 25,188 ||54–59 || W1
|- bgcolor="bbffbb"
| 114 || August 11 || White Sox || 2–1 || Duffy (9–1) || Fulmer (0–2) || — || 34,310 || 55–59 || W2
|- bgcolor="bbffbb"
| 115 || August 12 || @ Twins || 7–3 || Ventura (8–9) || Gibson (4–7) || — || 24,617 || 56–59 || W3
|- bgcolor="ffbbbb"
| 116 || August 13 || @ Twins || 3–5|| Duffey (8–8) || Gee (4–6) || Kintzler (11) || 30,147 || 56–60 || L1
|- bgcolor="bbffbb"
| 117 || August 14 || @ Twins || 11–4 || Vólquez (9–10) || Santiago (10–7) || Young (1) || 31,730 || 57–60 || W1
|- bgcolor="bbffbb"
| 118 || August 15 || @ Tigers || 3–1 || Kennedy (7–9) || Norris (1–1) || Herrera (5) || 29,803 || 58–60 ||W2
|- bgcolor="bbffbb"
| 119 || August 16 || @ Tigers || 6–1 || Duffy (10–1) || Verlander (12–7) || — || 28,663 || 59–60 || W3
|- bgcolor="bbffbb"
| 120 || August 17 || @ Tigers || 4–1 || Ventura (8–9) || Sánchez (6–12) ||Herrera (6)  || 28,790 || 60–60 || W4
|- bgcolor="bbffbb"
| 121 || August 18 || Twins || 8–1 || Gee (5–6)  || Duffey (8–9)  || — || 30,599 || 61–60 || W5
|- bgcolor="bbffbb"
| 122 || August 19 || Twins || 5–4 (11) || Wang (6–0)  || Chargois (0–1)  || — || 28,463 || 62–60 || W6
|- bgcolor="bbffbb"
| 123 || August 20 || Twins || 10–0 || Kennedy (8–9)  || Santiago (10–8)  || — || 29,268 || 63–60 || W7
|- bgcolor="bbffbb"
| 124 || August 21 || Twins || 1–2 || Duffy (11–1) || Santana (6–10) ||Herrera (7)  || 32,996 || 64–60 || W8
|- bgcolor="bbffbb"
| 125 || August 23 || @ Marlins || 1–0 || Ventura (9–9) || Cashner (4–10) ||Herrera (8)  || 18,513 || 65–60 || W9
|- bgcolor="ffbbbb"
| 126 || August 24 || @ Marlins || 0–3 || Fernández (13–7)  ||Gee (5–7)  || Rodney (25) || 17,894 || 65–61 || L1
|- bgcolor="bbffbb"
| 127 || August 25 || @ Marlins || 5–2 || Vólquez (10–10) || Koehler (9–9) || Herrera (9) || 19,045 || 66–61 || W1
|- bgcolor="bbffbb"
| 128 || August 26 || @ Red Sox || 6–3 || Kennedy (9–9) || Wright (13–6) || Herrera (10) || 38,143 || 67–61 || W2
|- bgcolor="ffbbbb"
| 129 || August 27 || @ Red Sox || 3–8 || Price (13–8)  ||Duffy (11–2)  || — || 37,933 || 67–62 || L1
|- bgcolor="bbffbb"
| 130 || August 28 || @ Red Sox || 10–4 || Strahm (2–0) || Rodriguez (2–6) || — || 37,337 || 68–62 || W1
|- bgcolor="bbffbb"
| 131 || August 29 || Yankees || 8–5 || Gee (6–7) || Pineda (6–11)  || Herrera (11) || 22,859 || 69–62 || W2
|- bgcolor="ffbbbb"
| 132 || August 30 || Yankees || 4–5 (10) || Betances (3–4) || Soria (4–6) || Shreve (1) || 22,895 || 69–63 || L1
|- bgcolor="ffbbbb"
| 133 || August 31 || Yankees || 4–5 (13) || Heller (1–0) || Young (3–9) || Betances (7) || 22,615 || 69–64 || L2
|-

|- bgcolor="ffbbbb"
| 134 || September 2 || Tigers || 6–7 || Rodríguez (3–3) || Davis (1-1) || — || 25,008 || 69–65 || L3
|- bgcolor="bbffbb"
| 135 || September 3 || Tigers || 5–2 || Ventura (10–9) || Fulmer (10–6) || Davis (21) || 39,757 || 70–65 || W1
|- bgcolor="ffbbbb"
| 136 || September 4 || Tigers || 5–6 || Greene (3–3) || Soria (4–7) || Rodríguez (38) || 34,616 || 70–66 || L1
|- bgcolor="bbffbb"
| 137 || September 5 || @ Twins || 11–5 || Kennedy (10–9) || Berríos (2–5) || — || 20,992 || 71–66 || W1
|- bgcolor="bbffbb"
| 138 || September 6 || @ Twins || 10–3 || Herrera (2–4) || Kintzler (0–2) || — || 22,194 || 72–66 ||W2
|- bgcolor="ffbbbb"
| 139 || September 7 || @ Twins || 5–6 || Wimmers (1–1) || Soria (4–8) || Kintzler (14) || 17,972 || 72–67 ||L1
|- bgcolor="ffbbbb"
| 140 || September 9 || @ White Sox || 2–7 || Rodon (7–8) || Ventura (10–10) || — || 20,653 || 72–68 ||L2
|- bgcolor="bbffbb"
| 141 || September 10 || @ White Sox || 6–5 || McCarthy (1–0) || Beck (2–2) || Davis (23) || 20,148 || 73–68 ||W1
|- bgcolor="bbffbb"
| 142 || September 11 || @ White Sox || 2–0 || Kennedy (11–9) || Sale (15–8) || Davis (24) || 20,107 || 74–68 ||W2
|- bgcolor="ffbbbb"
| 143 || September 12 || Athletics || 3–16 || Coulombe (3–1) || Gee (6–8) || Neal (2) || 31,061 || 74–69 ||L1
|- bgcolor="ffbbbb"
| 144 || September 13 || Athletics || 4–5 || Axford (6–4) || Strahm (2–1) || Madson (30) || 29,523 || 74–70 ||L2
|- bgcolor="ffbbbb"
| 145 || September 14 || Athletics || 0–8 || Manaea (6–9) || Ventura (10–11) || — || 30,006 || 74–71 ||L3
|- bgcolor="ffbbbb"
| 146 || September 15 || Athletics || 5–14 || Mengden (2–7) || Volquez (10–11) || — || 32,176 || 74–72 ||L4
|- bgcolor="ffbbbb"
| 147 || September 16 || White Sox || 4–7 || Sale (16–8) || Herrera (2–5) || — || 29,318 || 74–73 || L5
|- bgcolor="bbffbb"
| 148 || September 17 || White Sox || 3–2 || Gee (7–8) || González (4–7) || Davis (25) || 34,805 || 75–73 || W1
|- bgcolor="bbffbb"
| 149 || September 18 || White Sox || 10–3 || Duffy (12–2) || Quintana (12–11) || — || 34,982 || 76–73 || W2
|- bgcolor="bbffbb"
| 150 || September 19 || White Sox || 8–3 || Ventura (11–11) || Rodon (7–10) || — || 31,502 || 77–73 || W3
|- bgcolor="ffbbbb"
| 151 || September 20 || @ Indians || 1–2 || Miller (9–1) || Flynn (1–2) || — || 13,623 || 77–74 ||L1
|- bgcolor="ffbbbb"
| 152 || September 21 || @ Indians || 3–4 || Kluber (18–9) || Kennedy (11–10) || Allen (28) || 13,888 || 77–75 ||L2
|- bgcolor="ffbbbb"
| 153 || September 22 || @ Indians || 2–5 || Otero (5–1) || Gee (7–9) || Allen (29) || 15,253 || 77–76 ||L3
|- bgcolor="ffbbbb"
| 154 || September 23 || @ Tigers || 3–8 || Fulmer (11–7) || Duffy (12–3) || — || 29,480 || 77–77 ||L4
|- bgcolor="bbffbb"
| 155 || September 24 || @ Tigers || 7–4 || Davis (2–1) || Rodríguez  (3–4) || Herrera (12) || 31,721 || 78–77 ||W1
|- bgcolor="bbffbb"
| 156 || September 25 || @ Tigers || 12–9 || Gee (8–9) || Boyd (6–5) || — || 33,375 || 79–77 ||W2
|- bgcolor="bbffbb"
| 157 || September 27 || Twins || 4–3 (11) || Pounders (2–1) || Milone (3–5) || — || 28,435 || 80–77 ||W3
|- bgcolor="bbffbb"
| 158 || September 28 || Twins || 5–2 || Soria (5–8) || Rogers (3–1) || Davis (27) || 23,437 || 81–77 ||W4
|- bgcolor="ffbbbb"
| 159 || September 29 || Twins || 6–7 || Tonkin (3–2) || Herrera (2–6) || Kintzler (16) || 29,566 || 81–78 ||L1
|- bgcolor="ffbbbb"
| 160 || September 30 || Indians || 2–7 || Merritt (1–0) || Ventura (11–12) || — || 24,741 || 81–79 ||L2
|-

|- bgcolor="ffbbbb"
| 161 || October 1 || Indians || 3–6 || Clevinger (3–3) || Strahm (2–2) || Allen (31) || 28,569 || 81–80 ||L3
|- bgcolor="ffbbbb"
| 162 || October 2 || Indians || 2–3 || Tomlin (13–9) || Kennedy (11–11) || Allen (32) || 29,475 || 81–81 ||L4
|-

|- style="text-align:center;"
| Legend:       = Win       = Loss       = PostponementBold = Royals team member

Roster

Farm system

References

External links
2016 Kansas City Royals Official Site 
2016 Kansas City Royals at Baseball Reference

Kansas City Royals
Kansas City Royals seasons
Kansas City Royals